Karl-Heinz Thun (29 April 1937 – 15 June 1993) was a German sailor. He won a silver medal in the Dragon class together with Paul Borowski and Konrad Weichert at the 1972 Summer Olympics.

References

External links
 
 
 

1937 births
1993 deaths
Sportspeople from Rostock
German male sailors (sport)
Sailors at the 1968 Summer Olympics – Dragon
Sailors at the 1972 Summer Olympics – Dragon
Olympic sailors of East Germany
Olympic silver medalists for East Germany
Olympic bronze medalists for East Germany
Olympic medalists in sailing
Medalists at the 1972 Summer Olympics
Medalists at the 1968 Summer Olympics